Petra Kusch-Lück (born 6 April 1948, in Berlin, Germany) is a German host, entertainer, dancer and singer.

External links

1948 births
Musicians from Berlin
German women singers
German-language singers
Living people